Roger John Barrett (born 30 May 1950), known professionally as Wild Willy Barrett, is an English experimental musician and multi-instrumentalist, best known for his collaborations with John Otway. His musical style has included folk, blues, psychedelia, pop and punk rock and his live performances are punctuated with his dry humour and onstage wit. He is known for virtuoso fiddle playing, ability with a great number of stringed instruments, and playing slide guitar with a whole raw egg (known as egg-necking). During recent Otway/Barrett performances, he has also introduced the 'wah wah wheelie bin'.

Barrett is also a skilled wood worker and carver and has produced highly unusual furniture over many years.

Career
Barrett comes from Aylesbury. He started playing the ukulele at the age of 4 and soon moved on to other instruments.  By the age of 15 he was gigging regularly. He worked with and recorded alongside and in collaboration with his emerging contemporaries.  His first commercially available recordings can be found on Guitar Workshop, issued in 1973 by Transatlantic Records. He is also featured on The Contemporary Folk Guitar album with Bert Jansch, John Renbourn, Gordon Giltrap & Ralph McTell. He has worked with many well known artists and has toured with Squeeze, Madness and Steeleye Span and played fiddle, guitar and mandolin for George Hamilton IV. He also played pedal steel guitar on the influential Keith Hudson reggae album entitled Rasta Communication, along with Sly and Robbie.

During the early 1980s, he ran his own record labels; "Black Eye" and "Red Eye", which released music by artists Barrett knew and played with. Amongst them was Eddie Stanton whose songs have been covered extensively by Barrett both live and on record. Before it folded, Black Eye had a number of albums to be released most notably Please Don't Throw Me to the Christians by Stanton – most of the songs from Organic Bondage were derived from those on the album – and "Man of Many Fingers" which would have been Barrett's 3rd solo album.

In the mid-1980s, Barrett started experimenting and recording with a more electronic sound which had been explored in "DK 50/80" and "Birthday Boy" from "Way & Bar". Following his mostly single-based approach at that point he recorded two singles, "Old Joe Clarke" and "Rapping on a Mountain", in 1983, which were both released on Carrere Records. A single called "The Hitchhiker and the Punk" contained a much more textured and layered sound which was created from using in-studio effects and multi-tracking. This culminated, in Barrett's words "By far the most 'off the wall' musical project I have embarked on", in Organic Bondage. He made a wooden record sleeve for the album since he did not have the finances to get a sleeve printed.

In the 1990s, Barrett recorded two albums both featuring his consummate drummer Mark Freeman on cardboard box (an instrument he'd play live). Far from the electronic sound Barrett had been focussing on in the last decade, these two albums were more organic, specifically the second. Mound of Sound had been influenced and recorded on an old English burial mound and features much of the ambience and "feel" that those interring might have felt had they been born in the 21st century.

Barrett has been performing vocal and strings for Sleeping Dogz, a band that he formed with his partner, Mary Holland, and John Devine, and closed the Cambridge Folk Festival in 2003, 2004, 2005 and 2009. He toured autumn 2009 with John Otway and toured with Sleeping Dogz in April and May 2010.

In 2012, Barrett formed French Connection, using the Sleeping Dogz line-up, with the addition of French vocalist Aurora Colson. Their first live performance took place at The Flying Shack, Cheltenham on 9 November 2012. As of 2017, Barrett continues to tour.

In 2014, Barrett recorded and produced new songs for the "Krazy Kong 40th Anniversary" project.

Discography

Albums

CD albums

References

External links
 Official website
 

English folk singers
English folk musicians
English male singers
English fiddlers
British male violinists
Living people
1950 births
21st-century violinists
21st-century British male musicians